Venetian music may refer to:

 Music of Venice
 Music of Veneto